Kittipat Wongsombat is a Thai professional footballer who plays for Chiangmai United in Thai League 1 as a right midfielder.

References

External links
 

1990 births
Living people
Kittipat Wongsombat
Association football midfielders
Kittipat Wongsombat
Kittipat Wongsombat
Kittipat Wongsombat